T. carbonaria  may refer to:
 Tetragonula carbonaria, a stingless bee species endemic to Australia
 Timia carbonaria, a picture-winged fly species

See also
 Carbonaria (disambiguation)